Fleeceflower is a common name for genera and species in the subfamily Polygonoideae, and may refer to:

Bistorta affinis, synonym Persicaria affinis
Fallopia
Koenigia alpina
Koenigia × fennica, particularly the cultivar 'Johanneswolke' called "Persicaria polymorpha" in horticulture
Persicaria
Polygonum
Reynoutria japonica